The 10th Golden Raspberry Awards were held on March 25, 1990, at the Hollywood Roosevelt Hotel to recognize the worst the film industry had to offer in 1989.

The 1990 awards featured special awards for the worst motion picture performances of the 1980s. Unlike in prior years, no award was given for Worst New Star.

Awards and nominations

Worst of the Decade

Films with multiple nominations 
The following films received multiple nominations:

See also

1989 in film
62nd Academy Awards
43rd British Academy Film Awards
47th Golden Globe Awards

External links

Official summary of awards
Nomination and award listing  at the Internet Movie Database

Golden Raspberry Awards
Golden Raspberry Awards ceremonies
1990 in California
1990 in American cinema
March 1990 events in the United States
Golden Raspberry